Mudanyuan station is a subway station on Line 10 and Line 19 of the Beijing Subway.

History 
The station for Line 10 opened on July 19, 2008. It was closed for renovation (in order to interchange with Line 19) on April 10, 2021, and reopened on June 18, 2021. The station for Line 19 opened on December 31, 2021.

Etymology 
The name "Mudanyuan" dates back to 1990 when a residential community was built on the east of Beijing Television Factory (currently Beijing Peony Electronic Group). The community was then named after Peony, the brand of their products.

Platform Layout
The station has underground island platforms for both line 10 and line 19.

Exits 
There are 5 exits, lettered A, B, C, D, and F. Exits A and D are accessible.

Gallery

References

External links

Beijing Subway stations in Haidian District
Railway stations in China opened in 2008